Florent Van Aubel (born 25 October 1991) is a Belgian field hockey player who plays as a forward for Dutch Hoofdklasse club Pinoké and the Belgian national team.

Van Aubel studies Communication Sciences at the Vrije Universiteit Brussel and lives in Sint-Denijs-Westrem.

Club career
In 2010, he won the Golden Stick from the Belgian Hockey Association in the category of male junior players. In 2011 he was nominated by the International Hockey Federation (FIH) for best young player of the year. Also, Florent van Aubel participated with his club KHC Dragons at the Euro Hockey League. In 2012, he also played at the Euro Hockey League and finished third. After 13 years at Dragons he left Belgium in 2022 to play for Pinoké in the Dutch Hoofdklasse.

International career
At the 2012 Summer Olympics, he competed for the national team in the men's tournament where Belgium ended fifth. Van Aubel became European vice-champion with Belgium at the 2013 European Championship on home ground in Boom. After winning the silver medal at the Rio Olympics, he became World Champion at Bhubaneswar. In 2019, he was a part of the squad which won Belgium its first European title. On 25 May 2021, he was selected in the squad for the 2021 EuroHockey Championship.

Honours

International
Belgium
Olympic Gold Medal: 2020
Olympic Silver Medal: 2016
World Cup: 2018
EuroHockey Championship: 2019
FIH Pro League: 2020–21

Club
Dragons
Belgian Hockey League: 2009–10, 2010–11, 2014–15, 2015–16, 2016–17, 2017–18, 2020–21

References

External links
 
 
 
 

1991 births
Living people
Belgian male field hockey players
Male field hockey forwards
Field hockey players at the 2012 Summer Olympics
2014 Men's Hockey World Cup players
Field hockey players at the 2016 Summer Olympics
Field hockey players at the 2020 Summer Olympics
2018 Men's Hockey World Cup players
Olympic field hockey players of Belgium
Sportspeople from Ghent
Olympic silver medalists for Belgium
Olympic medalists in field hockey
Medalists at the 2016 Summer Olympics
KHC Dragons players
Men's Belgian Hockey League players
Olympic gold medalists for Belgium
Medalists at the 2020 Summer Olympics
Men's Hoofdklasse Hockey players
2023 Men's FIH Hockey World Cup players